Spongioradsia is an  genus of polyplacophoran molluscs. Spongioradsia became extinct during the Oligocene period.

Species
 Spongioradsia aleutica (Dall, 1878)
Synonyms
 Spongioradsia foveolata Is. Taki, 1938: synonym of Callochiton foveolatus (Is. Taki, 1938) (original combination)
 Spongioradsia subaleutica Sirenko, 1976: synonym of Lepidochitona (Lepidochitona) subaleutica (Sirenko, 1976) (original combination)

References

External links
 Pilsbry, H. A. (1893-1895). Manual of conchology, structural and systematic, with illustrations of the species. Ser. 1. Vol. 15: Polyplacophora (Chitons). Acanthochitidae, Cryptoplacidae and appendix. Tectibranchiata. pp 1-463, pls 1-58

Oligocene molluscs
Prehistoric chiton genera